WOAD (1300 AM) is a radio station licensed to Jackson with an urban gospel format. WOAD is owned by Alpha Media through licensee Alpha Media Licensee LLC.  Along with five other sister stations, its studios are located in Ridgeland, a suburb of Jackson, while the transmitter tower is in the northside of Jackson.

History
The 1300 kHz frequency was assigned the WRBC call letters for several years.  Around 1978, the transmitter site was rebuilt and call letters were changed to WKXI.

In March 1996, the WOAD call letters and gospel format moved to the more powerful 1300 kHz, after swapping frequencies with then-sister station WKXI.

On January 11, 2004, WOAD started simulcasting on FM—at 105.9.

July 2, 2009, WOAD dropped its FM simulcast and resumed AM-only broadcasting.

External links 
WOAD website

Gospel radio stations in the United States
OAD
Radio stations established in 1996
Alpha Media radio stations